Colonel Edward Douglas Brown-Synge-Hutchinson,  (6 March 1861 – 3 March 1940) was an Anglo-Irish soldier and a recipient of the Victoria Cross, the highest and most prestigious award for gallantry in the face of the enemy that can be awarded to British and Commonwealth forces.

Biography
He was born as Edward Douglas Brown in Kasauli, Dagshai, India, the son of Frances Dorothy Synge-Hutchinson and David Philip Brown of the 7th Queen's Own Hussars. Thus he was the nephew of both  Sir Edward Synge-Hutchinson and Lieutenant General Coote Synge-Hutchinson.

Brown was educated at Edinburgh Academy and the United Services College. He entered the Army as a Lieutenant in the 18th Hussars on 7 November 1883.  On 27 March 1889, he joined the 14th King's Hussars. From 1 January 1890 to 31 December 1894, he was Commandant of the Aldershot School of Instruction for Yeomanry.
 
Brown had achieved the rank of major when the 14th King's Hussars were mobilised for active service on 9 Oct0ber 1899 for service in the Second Boer War. They had been stationed at Newbridge in Ireland, and arrived in South Africa in January 1900. As a result of his courage under fire, he was awarded the Victoria Cross.  He was also mentioned twice in dispatches: on 29 November 1900 by Lord Roberts, Commander-in-Chief during the early part of the war and on 8 April 1902 by Lord Kitchener C-i-C during the latter part of the war

Brown left Cape Town for the United Kingdom in early May 1902, shortly before the end of the war, part of a detachment to attend the Coronation of King Edward VII. He received a brevet promotion to lieutenant-colonel in the South African Honours list published on 26 June 1902.

In 1904 he took the name (but was not able to inherit the title) of his maternal uncle, Sir Edward Synge-Hutchinson, to become Edward Douglas Brown-Synge-Hutchinson VC. 

In 1907 he made the rank of Colonel, took command of the 14th Hussars, and so served until 1911. In 1911 he was made a Companion of the Order of the Bath (CB).  He retired from the military in 1915.

Brown died in London .

VC details
Brown was 39 years old, and a major in the 14th Hussars, British Army during the Second Boer War when the following deed took place on 13 October 1900 at Geluk, South Africa for which he was awarded the VC:

The medal
His Victoria Cross is displayed at the 14th/20th King's Hussars Museum, Preston, Lancashire, England.

Arms

References

Irish Winners of the Victoria Cross (Richard Doherty & David Truesdale, 2000)
Monuments to Courage (David Harvey, 1999)
The Register of the Victoria Cross (This England, 1997)
Victoria Crosses of the Anglo-Boer War (Ian Uys, 2000)

External links
Location of grave and VC medal (Golders Green)
AngloBoerwar.com

1861 births
Irish recipients of the Victoria Cross
Second Boer War recipients of the Victoria Cross
14th King's Hussars officers
1940 deaths
Companions of the Order of the Bath
British Army personnel of the Second Boer War
People educated at Edinburgh Academy
18th Royal Hussars officers
Knights of Justice of the Order of St John
People educated at United Services College
British Army recipients of the Victoria Cross